Jack Trice Stadium (originally Cyclone Stadium and formerly Jack Trice Field, sometimes referred to as "the Jack") is a stadium located in Ames, Iowa, United States. Primarily used for college football, it is the home field of the Iowa State Cyclones. It is named in honor of Jack Trice, Iowa State's first African American athlete, who died of injuries sustained during a 1923 game against Minnesota. The stadium opened on September 20, 1975, with a 17–12 win over Air Force.

It is the third-largest stadium by capacity in the Big 12 Conference behind Darrell K. Royal - Texas Memorial Stadium and Gaylord Family Oklahoma Memorial Stadium, and the third-newest in the conference, behind only Milan Puskar Stadium of West Virginia (which had its design based on Jack Trice Stadium) and Baylor's McLane Stadium. Including hillside seats in the corners of the stadium, the facility's official capacity is 61,500. The school announced in May 2014 a planned expansion to 61,500.

The current record for single-game attendance, 61,500, was set on September 5, 2015, when the Cyclones defeated the University of Northern Iowa 31–7.

Jack Trice Stadium replaced Clyde Williams Field, which had been in use from 1914 through 1974. Williams Field was closed in 1975 and razed in 1978, and Martin and Eaton residence halls now stand on the ground.

Description
The stadium consists of double-decked grandstands running the length of either sideline and encompassing the south end zone.  The Richard O. Jacobson Athletic Building, an athletic center built in 1996, is located in the north end zone.  The field itself is slightly lower than the surrounding ground. There is a single main concourse for each of the grandstands. A three-level press box on the west side of the stadium was added to the stadium in 1997 for a cost of $6.2 million. Permanent lighting and a large video/scoreboard behind the bleachers in the south end zone were added in 2002. Later in the summer of 2011 a second video/scoreboard was added on the north side. At triple the size of the previous scoreboard, it stands over the Jacobson Athletic Building. Both scoreboards consist of three levels on the inside, with a camera perch on top. The stadium is part of the Iowa State Center, a sports, entertainment and continuing education complex located to the southeast of the university's main campus. North of the stadium is Hilton Coliseum, home to Iowa State Cyclones basketball, wrestling, volleyball and gymnastics teams, as well as other events such as musical festivals, rock concerts and university commencement ceremonies. Iowa State superfan Kyle Lawson has reportedly attended every game held at Jack Trice Stadium, dating back to 1975 (except for two games during the 2020 season that disallowed fans due to the COVID-19 pandemic).

Jack Trice

In 1975, the stadium's playing field was named in honor of Jack Trice, Iowa State's first African American athlete and the school's first athlete to die of injuries sustained during a Cyclone athletic competition.

On October 6, 1923, Trice and his Iowa State College teammates played against the University of Minnesota in Minneapolis, Minnesota. Because he was African American, on the night of the game, Trice had to stay at a different Minneapolis hotel from that of his teammates.

During the second play of the game, Trice's collarbone was broken.  Trice insisted he was all right and returned to the game. In the third quarter, while attempting to tackle a University of Minnesota ball carrier by throwing a roll block, Trice was trampled by three Minnesota players.  Although he claimed to be fine, Trice was removed from the game and sent to a Minneapolis hospital.  The doctors declared him fit to travel and he returned by train to Ames with his teammates.  On October 8, 1923, Trice died from hemorrhaged lungs and internal bleeding as a result of the injuries sustained during the game.

There was a great deal of speculation surrounding the play that resulted in Jack Trice's death. Many of his teammates claimed after the fact that the Gophers targeted him throughout the first two quarters because of his skin color. ISU teammate Johnny Behm told the Cleveland Plain Dealer in a 1979 interview, "One person told me that nothing out of the ordinary happened. But another who saw it said it was murder."

Trice's funeral was held at the Iowa State College central campus in Ames on October 16, 1923, with 4,000 students and faculty members in attendance. Before he was buried, his casket was draped in Iowa State's school colors, cardinal and gold.

As a result of his death, ISU did not renew their contract to play against Minnesota after the 1924 game. They would not play again until 1989.

Until 1997, the facility itself was known as Cyclone Stadium. Because of persistent requests by the students, the facility was renamed Jack Trice Stadium, making it the only stadium in Division I FBS named for an African American individual.

Construction

Initial construction
Jack Trice Stadium was completed in less than two years, from its ground breaking on October 26, 1973, to the first game, a victory over Air Force on September 20, 1975.  In late 1973 and spring of 1974, heavy earth-moving equipment shaped the embankments. A huge, movable form shaped the lower decks with thousands of cubic yards of concrete.  Originally, the stadium had a capacity of 42,500.

Previous expansions and renovations
1976
In 1976, bleachers were constructed in the end zones to increase the stadium's capacity to more than 46,000 (50,000 with standing room tickets).  Before then, all the seating was in the grandstands on the sidelines.

1995–1997
The stadium complex was transformed in 1995–96 with the construction of the state-of-the-art $10.6 million Richard O. Jacobson Athletic Building, in the north end-zone of Jack Trice Stadium. The Jacobson Building is the home of Cyclone athletics containing all sport and administrative offices except men's and women's basketball and volleyball.  The Ralph A. Olsen Building was also renovated at that time and it sits attached to the north end of the Jacobson Athletic Building. The Olsen Building, named in honor of prominent Ellsworth farmer and ISU alumnus, houses the strength and conditioning facilities, the team meeting rooms, and the locker rooms.

In 1996, a natural grass field and new drainage system made its debut, the field had been AstroTurf since 1975. In 1997, the $6.2 million, three-level press tower located on the west side was added to Jack Trice Stadium. The new press tower includes press and radio-television levels and nine sky box suites.

2002
The football atmosphere at Jack Trice Stadium was enhanced with the installation of a new million-dollar videoboard and scoreboard which replace its black and white predecessor.  Permanent lighting was also added to the side of the stadium for the 2002 season at a cost of $500,000.  Since then, ISU has played twice as many home night games as they did the previous 30 years.

2007–2009
Between the 2007 and 2009 football seasons, Jack Trice received its largest renovation project to date. With the completion of $30 million in renovations, the stadium has 22 new suites, a new wider concourses with new concessions and bathrooms on the east and west side, a new club section, improved disability seating, new fencing and gates, a new plaza near the main entrance, and many preservative renovations throughout the stadium.

The changes to suites also includes the expansion of two existing suites on the west side of the stadium and the installation of operable windows in all of the current suites.  Funding for these renovations came completely from the sale of stadium suites, club seats, increased ticket revenues and fund raising.

Richard O. "Dick" Jacobson donated $5 million to ISU athletics in 2008, for the purpose of continuing renovations to Jack Trice Stadium.  There will be a Jacobson Plaza constructed near the stadiums main entrance in his honor.  This donation was the largest donation ever made to ISU athletics.

2011 
A new video/scoreboard was installed on the north end of Jack Trice Stadium.  The screen measures 36 feet high and 79.5 feet wide and has a resolution of 720 x 1,584.   The new video board was completed for the 2011 football season.

2015

On May 1, 2008, ISU Athletic Department was given permission from the Iowa Board of Regents to continue planning and fund raising for the Jack Trice Expansion.  On November 25, 2013, it was announced that the Reiman family would donate $25 million to help complete the south end-zone project estimated at $60 million.  Iowa State Athletics gained approval from the Iowa Board of Regents for the construction of the south end-zone final phase on February 6, 2014.  Athletic Director Jamie Pollard has stated the target date of the south end-zone project was to complete the expansion before the start of the 2015 football season.  This expansion brought capacity from 54,800 to 61,500.

This south end-zone addition included enclosing the south end zone, which included an upper deck, and connected the east side concourse to the west side concourse. Originally, the south end-zone project was scheduled to be completed at the same time as the east concourse renovation; however, funding was not secured for the south end-zone expansion, so the two projects were completed separately.

On a call in show, ISU athletic director stated that more facility improvements will be continuing over the next few years.  Iowa State's head football coach Paul Rhoads has also made similar comments.  The $20.6 million Bergstrom football complex, a state-of-the-art training facility was built between the indoor practice facility and the Jacobson building with opening and dedication in 2012.

In 2014, it was announced that Iowa State would enclose their south end zone. This brought capacity to 61,500 including a lower bowl seating 7,500 and an upper bowl seating 5,800. Included in the lower bowl is a two-story, 40,000 square foot premium club with seating for more than 3,000.

Future renovations
Plans are underway to renovate the Jacobsen Building, demolish the Olsen Building and expand/renovate the Bergstrom Football Complex. The plans include a multi-story building situated between the Jacobsen Building and the Bergstrom Football Complex, including a new football locker room, academic center, dining center, and Olympic sports locker rooms. The north end of Jack Trice Stadium is expected to be slightly altered due to the construction, with permanent band seating and hillside alterations.

Sellouts

Listed are all sell-outs (61,500) since Jack Trice moved to its current configuration in 2015.

Top 25 wins

Listed are the wins by Iowa State over Top 25 teams at Jack Trice Stadium.

Football attendance

†Note: Due to the COVID-19 pandemic, Iowa State only allowed restricted attendance at four of six home games. The remaining two games disallowed fans.

See also
 List of NCAA Division I FBS football stadiums

References

External links

 

Iowa State Cyclones football venues
American football venues in Iowa
1975 establishments in Iowa
Sports venues completed in 1975